The Ministry of Culture (Arabic: وزارة الثقافة) is a cabinet ministry of Yemen.

List of Ministers
 Moamar al-Eryani (18 December 2020 – present)
 Marwan Damaj ( 18 September 2016 – December 2020) 
 Arwa Othman ( 7 November 2014 – 22 January 2015)
 Abdullah Al-Kibsi

See also
Politics of Yemen

References

Government ministries of Yemen